The Town of Kim is a Statutory Town in Las Animas County, Colorado, United States. The population was 74 at the time of the 2010 United States Census. , the town included a complete school system (grades K-12), a post office, and a general store.

A post office called Kim has been in operation since 1917. The town was named after the novel Kim by Rudyard Kipling.

Geography
Kim is located at  (37.246129, -103.353643).

Kim is located on the plains of southeastern Colorado and the elevation is 5690 ft (1734 m).

Demographics

As of the census of 2000, there were 65 people, 38 households, and 15 families residing in the town. The racial makeup of the town was 98.46% White, and 1.54% from two or more races. Hispanic or Latino of any race were 15.38% of the population.

There were 38 households, out of which 15.8% had children under the age of 18 living with them, 36.8% were married couples living together, 2.6% had a female householder with no husband present, and 60.5% were non-families. 60.5% of all households were made up of individuals, and 15.8% had someone living alone who was 65 years of age or older. The average household size was 1.71 and the average family size was 2.80.

In the town, the population was spread out, with 16.9% under the age of 18, 3.1% from 18 to 24, 30.8% from 25 to 44, 30.8% from 45 to 64, and 18.5% who were 65 years of age or older. The median age was 44 years. For every 100 females, there were 124.1 males. For every 100 females age 18 and over, there were 107.7 males.

The median income for a household in the town was $25,938, and the median income for a family was $36,667. Males had a median income of $22,500 versus $27,000 for females. The per capita income for the town was $16,343. There were 11.1% of the families and 14.5% of the population living below the poverty line, including none under eighteen and 20.0% of those over 64.

Climate
Kim experiences a semi-arid climate with hot summers and cold winters. Due to its high elevation and aridity, temperatures drop sharply after sunset. While daytime summer temperatures often exceed 90 degrees, nights are cool. Spring and Fall are mild. During the winter, temperatures can drop below zero at night, but are usually above freezing during the day. Kim receives most of its precipitation in the spring and late summer. Snow falls several times each winter, but rarely exceeds a few inches. Most snow melts within a few days, even in December or January.

See also

Outline of Colorado
Index of Colorado-related articles
State of Colorado
Colorado cities and towns
Colorado municipalities
Colorado counties
Las Animas County, Colorado

References

External links
CDOT map of Kim

Towns in Las Animas County, Colorado
Towns in Colorado